SeaRail is a company based in Tampere, Finland operating a logistics terminal. The company is jointly owned by Finland's VR Group and the Swedish rail freight company Green Cargo AB.

The company operated a train ferry for railway freight wagons between Turku, Finland, and Stockholm, Sweden. Because the  track gauge of the Finnish railways (VR) is  wider than the standard gauge of much of the rest of Europe (including Sweden), a special fleet of freight wagons with interchangeable bogies is used. The break-of-gauge point is several hundred meters inside Finland at Turku and the bogies are exchanged in a specially-equipped depot; this procedure can be achieved in 10 minutes and involves jacking up each wagon. The short section of  track at Turku is sometimes known as "Little Sweden".

The Tallink train ferry Sea Wind conveys the SeaRail wagons between Finland and Sweden. These operated twice-daily from Turku and Stockholm.
Rail car traffic onboard ferries from Turku to Stockholm were closed down on 30 April 2012.

See also 
 Bogie exchange
 Ramsey Car Transfer Apparatus
 Variable gauge axles
 Wheelset

External links 
 
 KN Nordic Rail (rival)

Ferry companies of Finland
Ferry companies of Sweden
Railway companies of Finland
Railway companies of Sweden
Companies based in Tampere